Chak92-6/R is a village in Bahawal pur divisions, District Bahawal Nagar, Tehsil Haroonabad. 
The major source of income is farming and most of the villagers have their own cattle, cows, sheep, buffalo, and goats. The major crops are cotton, wheat, and sugar cane.
The land of the village is very fertile as it is irrigated by the canal water and tube wells.
The people wear shalwar, kameez, and some farmers wear Dhotti kurta. They speak Punjabi. Some villagers live in mud houses, and the landowners in brick houses.

Populated places in Bahawalnagar District